Rathvon is a surname. Notable people with the surname include:

 Henry Rathvon, puzzle writer
 Simon Snyder Rathvon (1812–1891), American entomologist
 William R. Rathvon (1854–1939), businessman and author of an audio recording with his impressions of the Gettysburg Address